A list of Spanish-produced and co-produced feature films released in Spain in 1999. When applicable, the domestic theatrical release date is favoured.

Films

Box office 
The ten highest-grossing Spanish films in 1999, by domestic box office gross revenue, are as follows:

See also 
 14th Goya Awards

Informational notes

References

External links
 Spanish films of 1999 at the Internet Movie Database

1999
Spanish
Films